The banded antbird (Dichrozona cincta) – sometimes called banded antwren despite not being close to the true antwrens – is a species of bird in the family Thamnophilidae. It is the only member of the genus Dichrozona. Its natural habitat is subtropical or tropical moist lowland forests. Hence why it is predominantly located in Bolivia, Brazil, Colombia, Ecuador, Peru, and

The banded antbird was described by the Austrian ornithologist August von Pelzeln in 1868 and given the scientific name Cyphorhinus (Microcerculus) cinctus. The present genus Dichrozona was erected by the American ornithologist Robert Ridgway in 1888.

There are three subspecies:
 Dichrozona cincta cincta (Pelzeln, 1868) – east Colombia, south Venezuela and northwest Brazil
 Dichrozona cincta stellata (Sclater, PL & Salvin, 1880) – east Ecuador and west Brazil
 Dichrozona cincta zononota Ridgway, 1888 – west central Brazil and north Bolivia

References

Further reading
 
 
 

banded antbird
Birds of the Amazon Basin
Birds of the Colombian Amazon
Birds of the Ecuadorian Amazon
Birds of the Peruvian Amazon
banded antbird
banded antbird
Antbirds
Taxonomy articles created by Polbot